Jimmy Kelly (born 4 June 1933) was a Scottish professional footballer who played as a centre forward for Peterborough United, Preston North End, Swindon Town, Walsall and Yeovil Town.

References

1933 births
Living people
Scottish footballers
Peterborough United F.C. players
Preston North End F.C. players
Swindon Town F.C. players
Walsall F.C. players
Yeovil Town F.C. players
English Football League players
Association football forwards